Rear-Admiral Sir Robert Nathaniel Woodard, KCVO, DL (born 13 January 1939) is a former Commander of the Royal Yacht Britannia.

Naval career
Educated at Lancing College, the school founded by his great-grandfather, Rev Nathaniel Woodard, Woodard joined the Royal Navy and specialised in aviation. He commanded 771 Naval Air Squadron and 848 Naval Air Squadron and then took charge of the frigate HMS Amazon. Promoted to Captain he was given command of HMS Glasgow. Appointment as Flag Officer Sea Training and command of the naval air station HMS Osprey followed in 1985 and then became Commodore on the River Clyde in 1988 before being appointed Flag Officer, Royal Yachts with specific responsibility for the Royal Yacht Britannia in 1990. He retired in 1995.

He has served as equerry to the Queen and as Deputy Lieutenant of Cornwall. The Sir Robert Woodard Academy, which has been named in his honour, was opened on the site of the previous school, Boundstone Community College, in September 2009.

Family
In 1963 he married Rosamund Lucia Gibbs; they have two sons and one daughter.

References

External links
 Imperial War Museum Interview

Living people
People educated at Lancing College
Knights Commander of the Royal Victorian Order
Royal Navy admirals
1939 births
Deputy Lieutenants of Cornwall